Land reform in Zambia refers to the process of land reform in Zambia.

Zimbabwean farmers
In 2001, neighbouring Zimbabwe's government undertook aggressive land reform policies which included invasions of farms owned by White Zimbabweans. Many of those farmers moved to Zambia and took up farming again. They produced maize and tobacco on large farms.

References

External links
 Getting Agreement on Land Tenure Reform: The Case of Zambia by Joseph Mbinji, Zambia Land Alliance
 PSIA Summary – Zambia Land Reform World Bank
  Contestation, confusion and corruption: Market-based land reform in Zambia by Taylor Brown, Oxfam 

Economy of Zambia
Agriculture in Zambia
Zambia
Reform in Zambia